Abivax SA is a French clinical-stage, publicly traded biotechnology company harnessing the immune system to develop novel treatments against inflammatory diseases, viral diseases and cancer. The company is headquartered in Paris, France  and closely cooperates with the CNRS Collaborative Laboratory in Montpellier, France.

Founding and IPO 
Abivax has been founded in December 2013 in Paris under the leadership of Truffle Capital by Phillipe Pouletty, co-founder and chairman of the board. 

In 2015, Abivax launched its initial public offering on the stock market Euronext in Paris, raising EUR 57.7m, a record amount for a French biotechnology company on the Euronext in Paris. 

Initially, Abivax focused on the development of a novel treatment in HIV with lead drug candidate ABX464. As the molecule showed a strong anti-inflammatory effect in preclinical models, Abivax decided to conduct a Phase 2a clinical study in ulcerative colitis, an inflammatory bowel disease (IBD). Based on the promising results of this clinical study in ulcerative colitis, the company decided to shift its focus towards the treatment of chronic inflammatory diseases.

Pipeline

ABX464 in inflammatory diseases 
Abivax focuses on the treatment of inflammatory diseases, namely ulcerative colitis (UC), Crohn’s disease (CD), rheumatoid arthritis (RA) and also COVID-19, where the hyper-inflammation syndrome is known to be the cause of the severe form of the disease. Its lead drug candidate, ABX464, is an oral, first-in-class, small molecule that has demonstrated safety and tolerability as well as profound anti-inflammatory activity in preclinical as well as clinical trials in UC and HIV.

ABX464 for the treatment of ulcerative colitis 
ABX464 is currently being tested in a clinical Phase 2b trial in patients with moderate-to-severe ulcerative colitis, composed of an induction and a maintenance study, conducted in 15 European countries, Canada and the US. The previously conducted Phase 2a induction and maintenance studies in UC generated very promising results  with regard to safety and tolerability, as well as durable efficacy of ABX464 after the second year of treatment.

ABX464 for the treatment of Crohn’s disease 
Based on the good safety profile and promising efficacy results obtained for ABX464 in UC and due to the clinical similarities of CD and UC, Abivax has been encouraged by its KOLs to initiate a pivotal Phase 2b/3 trial for the treatment of CD.

ABX464 for the treatment of rheumatoid arthritis 
In addition to the clinical observations in UC patients, Abivax generated promising pre-clinical data from collagen-induced arthritis animal models that were the basis for moving into the ongoing Phase 2a clinical trial in rheumatoid arthritis. 
The study investigates the safety and tolerability of ABX464 in combination with methotrexate in patients with moderate-to-severe active RA. Patients enrolled in the study had an inadequate response to methotrexate or/and to one or more antitumor necrosis factor alpha (TNFα) therapies.

ABX464 for the treatment of COVID-19 
Due to the lack of an effective vaccine or treatment option and based on the potentially beneficial effect of ABX464 to reduce the severity of COVID-19 disease and to prevent acute respiratory distress syndrome (ARDS), Abivax decided to expand its clinical trial program to treat COVID-19 high-risk patients. The company has initiated a Phase 2b/3 clinical trial to test the potentially beneficial antiviral, anti-inflammatory and tissue repair properties of ABX464 in this indication.

ABX196 for the treatment of hepatocellular carcinoma 
ABX196 is Abivax’s second drug candidate currently in clinical development. ABX196 has been developed as a synthetic agonist of iNKT cells, demonstrating immune enhancing effects in cancer models.
Together with the Scripps MD Anderson Cancer Center in San Diego, California, and the MD Anderson Cancer Center in Houston, Texas, Abivax is currently conducting a Phase 1/2 clinical trial of ABX196 to treat patients with hepatocellular carcinoma (HCC), the most common form of liver cancer.

Abivax research activities 
Abivax is conducting all R&D work in Montpellier where half of the company’s staff is based at its collaborative laboratory. The scientists in Montpellier closely collaborate with the French National Center for Scientific Research (CNRS), the Institut Curie and the University of Montpellier.

References

2015 initial public offerings
Biotechnology companies established in 2013
Biotechnology companies of France
Companies based in Paris
Companies listed on Euronext Paris
French companies established in 2013
Life sciences industry
Pharmaceutical companies established in 2013
Pharmaceutical companies of France